James J. Mingus (born 1964) is a United States Army lieutenant general who serves as the director of the Joint Staff. He previously served as the director for operations of the Joint Staff. He attended the United States Army War College and Winona State University. A native of Spencer, Iowa, he first enlisted in the Iowa Army National Guard in 1981 and was commissioned in 1985.

References

1964 births
Living people
People from Spencer, Iowa
Recipients of the Defense Superior Service Medal
Recipients of the Legion of Merit
United States Army generals
United States Army personnel of the Iraq War
United States Army personnel of the War in Afghanistan (2001–2021)
United States Army War College alumni
Winona State University alumni